Kirk Balk Academy is a secondary school located in Barnsley, South Yorkshire, England. It is part of the Northern Education Trust. The school mainly serves students living in its immediate area: Birdwell, Hoyland, Jump, Tankersley, Elsecar, Wombwell and Pilley.

The school is an 11-16 academy teaching a wide curriculum in lower school (Y7-9) with a variety of qualifications in the upper school (Y10-11), such as GCSE and BTEC.

Construction of a new building for the school was finished in late 2011, allowing for the demolition of the old building. This made space for a new school sports field. Additionally, the school changed its name from Kirk Balk School to Kirk Balk Community College, changing the logo and uniform in the process. In September 2014, the school was renamed Kirk Balk Academy, and in March 2015 it was formally converted to academy status, sponsored by the Northern Education Trust. In September 2016, Ms Jo Nolan became the Executive Principal of Kirk Balk Academy until 2018, when she was replaced by Mr Dean Buckley.

Uniform 
Students wear full academy uniforms at all times on the academy premises or on an academy visit, unless otherwise stated. The uniform consists of a blue blazer with the current academy logo embroidered on the front pocket, a white shirt or blouse, a house coloured tie and a pair of black tailored trousers or a black skirt. The uniform worn for physical education consists of a navy blue, light blue and white polo shirt embroidered with the Academy logo, and a pair of black shorts or jogging bottoms.

House System 
Kirk Balk Academy has 4 houses:
 Rosalind Franklin House (Red)
 Pablo Picasso House (Yellow)
 Leonardo da Vinci House (Green)
 William Shakespeare House (Blue)
Each house has its own ethos, guiding standards, and routines which help develop a family culture.

Events 
The school hosts a whole school inter-house sports day in the last week of term each year. Students represent their house in athletic track and field events. Students also can compete through taking part in a range of other team sports, such as football, rounders, and tennis.

Timetable 
The school timetable consists of one set week. This provides a variety of lessons, so that the pupils receive the correct number of hours in a lesson each week. The school day starts at 8:20am and finishes at 2:30pm. A wide range of enrichment activities are run from 2:30pm to 3:30pm, and can help students to further develop their academic progress.

Ofsted Inspection 
In the latest Ofsted inspection (January 2020), the school was rated as good.

References

External links 
School Homepage

Northern Education Trust schools
Secondary schools in Barnsley
Academies in Barnsley
Hoyland